Richardson v Forestry Commission of Tasmania is an Australian legal decision in which the High Court of Australia upheld a Commonwealth law providing interim protection of an area of Tasmanian wilderness while an inquiry assessed what parts of the wilderness should be listed for World Heritage protection.

It implemented the constitutional external affairs power for environmental protection, the last time this part of the Australian Constitution was used was in 1983 Tasmanian Dams Case.

References

External links

 

External affairs power in the Australian Constitution cases
Forestry in Australia
High Court of Australia cases
Tasmanian forests
1988 in case law
1988 in Australian law
1988 in the environment